Tom Clancy's Splinter Cell: Blacklist is an action-adventure stealth video game developed by Ubisoft Toronto and published by Ubisoft. The seventh installment of the Tom Clancy's Splinter Cell series, it is the sequel to Splinter Cell: Conviction. In the game, players control Sam Fisher, a spymaster working for the Fourth Echelon, in a mission to stop the Engineers, a group of terrorists which is trying to coerce the United States into recalling all of its troops stationed abroad. Blacklist gameplay is similar to its predecessors, with players tasked with completing objectives and defeating enemies. Blacklist marks the return of the asymmetrical multiplayer mode Spies vs. Mercs, which was introduced in Pandora Tomorrow.

It is the first title developed by Ubisoft Toronto, a studio founded by Ubisoft in 2009. The game was directed by Maxime Béland, who had worked on Conviction, and produced by Jade Raymond. The game endeavors to combine elements of its predecessors, including the action focus of Conviction and the stealth focus of the older games. To prepare for this game, Béland studied reviews and feature lists of the latter. Blacklist is the first Splinter Cell game starring Eric Johnson as Sam Fisher, as Michael Ironside, who voiced the character in previous games, was unable to reprise his role after being diagnosed with cancer. The later-announced Wii U version was developed by Ubisoft Shanghai, which also developed the game's multiplayer.

Announced at E3 2012, the game was released worldwide for Microsoft Windows, PlayStation 3, Wii U, and Xbox 360 in August 2013. The game received generally positive reviews when it was released, with praise for its level design, story, gameplay, combat, soundtrack and multiplayer mode. However, criticism was directed at its dated graphics, lack of challenge and ending. Particular criticism was also directed toward the voice casting choice of Johnson as Sam Fisher, for sounding too young when compared to Ironside's performance. It also underperformed Ubisoft's sales expectations, with sales of two million copies three months after its release.

Gameplay

In Blacklist, players assume control of series protagonist  Sam Fisher as he seeks to stop a terrorist group called the Engineers. The gameplay emphasizes stealth, and utilizes the third-person perspective. During the game, players can rotate its camera, run, crouch and leap over obstacles. Since Blacklist intended to continue the "aggressive stealth" of Conviction while retaining the traditional stealth features of the older games, it combines action and stealth, and allows players to use different approaches and methods to complete objectives and defeat enemies. Players can complete levels without being noticed by any enemy by methods such as taking cover or scaling ledges. If the player chooses to kill enemies, other enemies are alerted when they see their companions' dead bodies. To avoid this, players can hide corpses. Fisher can also create a strategically advantageous dark environment by destroying nearby lights, and is equipped with customizable night-vision and sonar goggles to detect enemies in darkness and see through walls. He also has the Tri-Rotor, a compact surveillance drone which can spy on enemies, create distractions, give electric shocks, and self-destruct to kill enemies.

Players can play a more aggressive run-and-gun game by using gadgets and weapons to eliminate enemies. They can interact with environmental objects, such as ledges and zip-lines, to navigate levels. Conviction mark-and-execute system returns in Blacklist, with refinements and additions to allow players to mark several targets. When they attack, they can kill all marked targets instantly. Improvements made the system work more fluidly. A variety of enemies (including soldiers and dogs) are encountered in the game, following the protagonist and alerting their companions. Players have the option to kill them, leave them untouched, or incapacitate them, and the game classifies their choices in one of three categories: Ghost (stealthy play), Panther (stealthy, aggressive play), and Assault (aggressive play). Although the game has interrogation sequences involving questioning (or torturing) targets, it does not feature Conviction interactive torture scenes. Players can still decide whether to spare their targets or kill them after interrogation,

The Paladin is the game's hub. Between missions, players can interact with crew members on the ship and view the game's objectives. Crew members also offer the protagonist side missions to complete. Before a mission Fisher can deploy the strategic mission interface, allowing players to see enemy positions and plan attacks and routes. Players can also use the interface to access multiplayer modes and missions. When players kill (or avoid) targets and complete objectives, experience points named "Ghost Points" and money are awarded to buy (or improve) weapons, and upgrade the Paladin airship and Sam's suit and equipment; the upgrades improve efficiency in completing missions. Experience gained depends on the difficulty level and how the game is played; the greater the stealth, the greater the reward. According to Ubisoft Toronto, the system, known as "universal economy", was intended to satisfy players; every action has a corresponding reward.

Blacklist has platform-specific features, including voice integration with Xbox 360's Kinect peripheral which allows players to distract enemies before attacking them or to call in an air strike. In the Wii U version, the Gamepad controller's touchscreen is an interface, accessing gadgets and other features from the protagonist's arm-mounted computer (OPSAT), and incorporating screen and motion controls to highlight enemies with thermal vision when using Killing in Motion. The Wii U version was not shipped with the game's cooperative mode.

Multiplayer
The "Spies vs. Mercs" competitive mode introduced in Pandora Tomorrow again appears in Blacklist. An asymmetrical multiplayer mode, it pits two teams (with different gadgets, playing as spies or mercenaries) against each other. Spies, in third-person perspective, are equipped with smoke grenades and flashbangs and are tasked with hacking computer stations heavily guarded by mercenaries.  Spies have more versatile movements as they can also climb onto rooftops, hide inside air vents and scale ledges. Mercenaries, in first person, can access lethal and longer-range weapons despite being unable to stealth-kill enemies or move very fast. The mode has two varieties: Classic, supporting teams of 2v2, and Blacklist, supporting 4v4 action. This mode features a progressive leveling system, allowing players to customise and upgrade the two character classes.

Blacklist also has a co-operative multiplayer mode, where each mission can be accessed by talking with the crew of the Paladin. Crew members offer a variety of missions and requirements for completing them, and players play as Fisher or his colleague Briggs; both have the same abilities. The mark-and-execute system works slightly differently in the cooperative mode, with enemies wearing helmets require both players to mark them before they can be killed. The cooperative mode has a total of 14 missions, with split-screen play supported. In addition to co-op and Spies vs. Mercs, Blacklist has other multiplayer modes including Uplink control, Team Deathmatch, and Extraction.

The game's multiplayer functionality was set to be shut down on September 1, 2022.  The date was later delayed to October 1, 2022.

Synopsis

Characters
Blacklist again features Sam Fisher (Eric Johnson), a former Third Echelon Splinter Cell who is now the spymaster and commander of the newly installed Fourth Echelon. The game also sees the return of Fisher's old ally, Anna "Grim" Grímsdóttir (Kate Drummond), and new characters such as Isaac Briggs (Dwain Murphy) and Charlie Cole (David Reale). Several supporting characters from Conviction reappear, including Victor Coste (Howard Siegel), Patricia Caldwell (Mimi Kuzyk), and Andriy Kobin (Elias Toufexis), as well as interactive telephone conversations with Sarah Fisher (Victoria Sanchez).

Plot

Two years after Third Echelon is dissolved, Sam Fisher takes up work as a contractor for Paladin 9 Security – a private military company run by his friend Victor Coste. While assigned to a USAF base in Guam, terrorists assault the installation, executing its commander and killing hundreds of service members, while heavily injuring Coste. A faction known as the "Engineers" publicly takes responsibility for the attack, announcing it will launch a series of weekly "Blacklist" attacks on the United States until it recalls its troops deployed abroad. U.S. President Caldwell assigns Sam and his colleagues – tech expert Charlie Cole, CIA operative Isaac Briggs, and technical analyst Anna Grímsdóttir – in to the newly formed Fourth Echelon, a new top secret special-ops and counter-terrorism unit which operates out of a converted military cargo plane known as "the Paladin".

Fourth Echelon traces the weapons used in the Guam attack to arms dealer Andriy Kobin, a former target of Sam's operating in Benghazi. Through him, the group trace his buyers to Iraq, whereupon Sam learns that the Engineers' leader is Majid Sadiq (Carlo Rota), a former MI6 agent. Learning a Blacklist attack is targeting Chicago, Sam infiltrates the site of the attack and prevents the release of a biological toxin into the city's water supply. Fourth Echelon traces the supplier to Iran-affiliated mercenary broker Reza Nouri (Sam Kalilieh), whom Sam extracts from Paraguay before a team of Iranian Qods Force commandos can kill him. Nouri willingly supplies information that leads Fourth Echelon to finding evidence linking the Engineers as an Iranian outfit. However, while seeking further evidence to support this, from within the Qods Force headquarters in Tehran, Sam finds the Engineers falsely implicated Iran in the attacks, in order to raise tensions between the Iranians and the United States.

After successfully stopping another attack in Philadelphia, forcing the Engineers to increase their attacks to one per day, Sam and Briggs travel to the Guantanamo Bay detention camps when Fourth Echelon learns that Nouri is feeding false information to the CIA to reignite tensions between the U.S. and Iran. Their interrogation of Nouri reveals that Sadiq sought to distract the US government from an imminent attack on the Gulf Coast's fuel supply. 

Sam becomes forced to protect the Paladin when Sadiq sends groups out to attack Fourth Echelon, allowing the Engineers to use a hijacked tanker to assault the Sabine Pass LNG terminal. After defending the Paladin and combating the fire at the terminal, Sam learns that the attacks were aimed at forcing the US president to begin continuity-of-government procedures – Sadiq's goal was to steal government data files by arranging for their transfer to a secure bunker under the Denver International Airport, by having COG procedures activated by his attacks.

Against Caldwell's orders, Fourth Echelon infiltrates the bunker as Sadiq's sleeper agents take control of the facility and its personnel, including the Secretary of Defense. Before the Secretary succumbs to torture and yields to requests to transfer the files to Sadiq, Briggs kills him, but is promptly taken hostage along with several others as human shields. Sam, disguised as a hostage, helps Delta Force snipers to take down Sadiq's men, before incapacitating Sadiq after a fight, as he tries to escape using the Paladin. Sadiq boasts that he has already won, claiming that his death will lead the United States into war with nations that supported the Engineers, while his trial for war crimes will lead to the country's secrets being leaked. Sam opts to detain him, with Caldwell publicly concealing Sadiq's imprisonment by announcing his death. In a post-credits scene, while Fourth Echelon continues its operations, a recovered Coste joins Sam, as they prepare to interrogate Sadiq.

Co-op missions
Intertwined with the main plot, the co-op missions begin with Sam and Briggs infiltrating Kashmir. Finding a group of smugglers linked to the Engineers, Sam and Briggs discover intelligence connecting them to the Russian intelligence organization Voron, before they escape during a drone attack.

Following a lead to a friendly missile base in Bangalore, they find the Indian inhabitants dead and Voron agents stealing the warhead from a missile. Securing the missile and learning that the agents are led by a man named Cherski, Sam and Briggs escape as the building is destroyed and Indian authorities arrive. Unaware of Cherski's identity, Sam and Briggs track him to a Voron base in Chittagong and find him living in a nearby apartment. They breach Cherski's panic room and find two people; uncertain which one is Cherski, they begin interrogating both and learn about a secret base in Russia.

Sam and Briggs reach an abandoned naukograd, surviving a drone attack, and find a secure medical facility said to contain an OpSat (satellite uplink device used by Fourth Echelon operatives) with vital Voron information. Instead, the base contains a comatose man. Rescuing the man, Sam and Briggs narrowly escape as the base self-destructs and return the patient to the Paladin. Grim identifies him as Mikhail "Kestrel" Loskov and Kobin confirms his identity, noting that they have a history (detailed in Conviction). When he questions Kobin (who asks if Kestrel's gunshot wound has put him into a coma), Sam notes that no one had told Kobin how Kestrel had been incapacitated.

Development

Ubisoft Montreal's success inspired the company to continue its Canadian expansion, and a new studio, Ubisoft Toronto, was announced on July 6, 2009. Headed by Jade Raymond, the studio focuses on the creation of triple-A video games and intellectual property. It worked on a new installment of the Splinter Cell series, which was in parallel development with an unnamed project, and the Toronto team was made up of Ubisoft Montreal's core Conviction team. Maxime Béland, who had worked on Conviction, was the game's creative director, and in November 2010 Raymond confirmed that her studio was developing Splinter Cell 6. Ubisoft Toronto was the game's lead developer, with assistance from Ubisoft Montreal. Ubisoft Shanghai developed the game's co-operative multiplayer mode. The Toronto studio focused on the game's Windows, PlayStation 3 and Xbox 360 versions, with the Wii U version developed by Ubisoft Shanghai.

In 2010, the series' fifth installment, Conviction, was released. Although it received generally positive reviews, it was criticized by series fans for lacking some features. Béland considered Conviction a "stepping stone" for him when he prepared for the development of Blacklist. The development team studied Conviction reviews and feature lists, deciding to discard its "black-and-white" stealth approach, and also deciding to bring back the Spies vs. Mercs mode introduced in Pandora Tomorrow. Béland called the mode's return "the easiest decision of [his] life", since the team considered its absence Conviction greatest misstep. Ubisoft sent questionnaires through Uplay to thousands of players to collect feedback on Conviction new features. When players called Conviction campaign weak and short, the team added a stronger storyline and greater character depth by introducing the Fourth Echelon and Fisher as a leader (a series first). To encourage repeat play the team introduced the aircraft hub and the strategic mission interface, a player menu.

According to Ubisoft Toronto founder Jade Raymond, the series had become too grueling and complicated for modern gamers, and its popularity had suffered relative to Ubisoft flagship franchises such as Assassin's Creed and Far Cry. The Toronto studio hoped to introduce the franchise to a broader audience, while remaining tactical and hardcore for long-term series fans. It introduced a perfectionist mode, significantly increasing the game's difficulty by removing some of Fisher's abilities. The team also introduced accessible, action-oriented gameplay segments which would suit new players, crafting open-ended levels which could be reached with different approaches to broaden the variety of play. The developers re-worked the controls to increase gameplay fluidity, allowing players to automatically leap over objects and traverse a simplified environment.

During Blacklist development, its team faced a variety of challenges. The first was to create stealth which was satisfying and fun for players. According to the team, players gain satisfaction from stealth with freedom and choices which allow them to develop a plan. Players must experiment, with each decision having consequences. Game director Patrick Redding compared it to the development of an ecosystem; the team designed a dynamic artificial intelligence which would react differently to players' actions, making levels feel alive and adding randomness. Encouraging the "panther" style of play (aggressive stealth), the team incorporated elements from the original Tom Clancy's Splinter Cell (where one mistake would abort a mission) and Conviction (where stealth seamlessly becomes combat). This approach, the team thought, could help players to feel like elite, silent predators.

Series veteran Michael Ironside did not reprise his role as the voice of Sam Fisher. His part was played by Eric Johnson, who also performed the motion capture. In a Blacklist developer diary, Ironside said that he was passing the torch to another actor. According to Ubisoft executives the change was made to take advantage of new performance-capture technology to enrich the game experience, and Ironside assisted Johnson with the role. Elias Toufexis, voice and performance-capture actor for Andriy Kobin in Splinter Cell: Conviction, said that he would return for the new game.

Unlike Conviction, the game would have no interactive torture sequences. Instead, players could choose whether to kill or incapacitate a target after interrogation. The system was not complex, and it was hoped that players would choose based on instinct. According to Béland, every player choice is gray and there are no right or wrong choices. However, the game demo has an interactive torture scene in which players can decide how deeply a knife penetrates a person's shoulder. After a mixed-to-negative response, Ubisoft removed the scene from its final product.

Marketing
Splinter Cell: Blacklist was introduced at E3 2012's Microsoft press conference on June 4, 2012, for Microsoft Windows, PlayStation 3, and Xbox 360. In February 2013, a Wii U version was rumored to be in development, and Ubisoft confirmed the report two months later. Originally scheduled for release in early 2013, the game was pushed back to August on January 16, 2013. On August 3, 2013, Ubisoft confirmed that the game had been declared gold, indicating that it was being prepared for duplication and release. Splinter Cell: Blacklist was released in North America on August 20 and in Europe three days later for Microsoft Windows, PlayStation 3, Wii U, and Xbox 360.

The Paladin Collector's Edition, a limited edition of the game, has a remote-controlled plane, the graphic novel Splinter Cell Echoes, a Billionaire's Yacht co-op map, an Upper Echelon pack with a Dead Coast map, gold sonar goggles, and a limited-edition poster. Splinter Cell: Blacklist - Spider Bot, a 2D puzzle game tie-in, was released for Android and iOS platforms on June 10, 2013 and is available on Google Play and the App Store respectively. Homeland, downloadable content for the game, was released on September 26, 2013. It added a crossbow, several new costumes, and two new missions which can be completed alone or with another player.

Reception

Pre-release
Although Joystiq's Mike Schramm praised Blacklist early screenshots and videos for removing Conviction monochromatic visuals, its new voice actor was not received well by some fans. Ubisoft responded with a statement that Ironside was not returning as Fisher because an actor "physically capable" of a motion-capture performance was needed, and Johnson was hired for the role.

Critical reception

Tom Clancy's Splinter Cell: Blacklist received positive reviews. The review aggregator website Metacritic rated the PlayStation 3 version 84 out of 100, the Xbox 360 version  82 out of 100, the PC version 82 out of 100, and the Wii U version 75 out of 100.

The game's design was praised by most reviewers. Ryan McCaffrey of IGN praised the gameplay's variety and player options, which he thought made Blacklist the best installment in the series since Tom Clancy's Splinter Cell: Chaos Theory. According to McCaffrey, the game was a satisfying stealth experience and an excellent, capable shooter (increasing its replay value). He noted that several segments forced players to use the Mark and Execute feature, frustrating players who favored stealth over action. Ben Reeves of Game Informer praised the return and refinement of Mark and Execute, which he found satisfying, and praised the game's intense, varied mission design. Tom Bramwell of Eurogamer disliked the game's direction, particularly its action elements (which he compared to 2012's Hitman: Absolution).

Blacklist campaign was also generally praised. According to IGN's McCaffrey, the game's story is superior to those of its predecessors: well-balanced and believable. He criticized Sam Fisher's new voice actor, who he thought failed to replicate Ironside's charm. Ben Reeves praised the story's plot twists and sympathetic characters. On the Joystiq blog, Xav De Matos liked the game's narrative urgency and engaging plot twists but criticized its rushed ending. Simon Miller of VideoGamer.com called the game forgettable and boring, with Fisher's new voice actor failing to bring personality to the character. Eurogamer Bramwell also criticized the game's lack of character development.

Its multiplayer features were praised; according to McCaffrey, the co-operative multiplayer mode had enough content for a separate game. Although he appreciated Spies vs. Mercs' faster pace, he found the mode less innovative than its predecessor. Reeves partially agreed, describing the revived Spies vs. Mercs mode as refreshing, intense, and bloody. De Matos wrote that it was one of the best multiplayer modes he had ever experienced, and the Blacklist version had evolved and modernized while remaining creative. Daniel Bloodworth of GameTrailers praised the game's satisfying co-op design, which tasks players to plan and coordinate strategy.

Blacklist graphics and lack of difficulty were criticized (the former likely due to the game still using Unreal Engine 2.5 that Splinter Cell games since Chaos Theory have used). McCaffrey found the visuals unimpressive and most character models to be ugly; he also noted technical problems, such as screen-tearing and frame rate issues. Bloodworth criticized the game's invisible wall and unresponsive controls in certain segments, although he thought those minor issues did not drag down its overall experience. McCaffrey noted that even when the game is played in perfectionist mode, it is less challenging than its predecessors. He thought Blacklist gave players too many rewards, making its universal-economy system a useless feature. Bloodworth was puzzled by the game's unlock system, which he said hindered its credibility.

Sales
Ubisoft hoped that Tom Clancy's Splinter Cell: Blacklist would sell at least five million copies. The game debuted at number two on the UK retail software sales chart in its first week of release, behind Saints Row IV. It was August's fourth-bestselling game in the United States. On October 16, 2013 Ubisoft announced that Blacklist had failed to meet sales expectations, and on November 13 it was announced that the game had sold two million copies worldwide.

References

External links
 

2013 video games
Action-adventure games
Kinect games
Nintendo Network games
PlayStation 3 games
Stealth video games
Tom Clancy games
Tom Clancy's Splinter Cell
Ubisoft games
Unreal Engine games
Video games developed in Canada
Video games set in the 2010s
Video games set in Afghanistan
Video games set in Antarctica
Video games set in Australia
Video games set in Bangladesh
Video games set in California
Video games set in Chechnya
Video games set in Chicago
Video games set in Colombia
Video games set in Cuba
Video games set in Denver
Video games set in Equatorial Guinea
Video games set in Estonia
Video games set in Guam
Video games set in India
Video games set in Iran
Video games set in Iraq
Video games set in Jordan
Video games set in Kazakhstan
Video games set in Lebanon
Video games set in Libya
Video games set in London
Video games set in Louisiana
Video games set in Mexico
Video games set in Namibia
Video games set in New Jersey
Video games set in Paraguay
Video games set in Philadelphia
Video games set in Russia
Video games set in Rwanda
Video games set in Slovakia
Video games set in Turkey
Video games set in the United Kingdom
Video games set in the United States
Video games set in Yemen
Guantanamo Bay detention camp
Wii U eShop games
Wii U games
Windows games
Xbox 360 games
Multiplayer and single-player video games
Asymmetrical multiplayer video games